Ian Christie  (born 1945) is a British film scholar.  He has written several books including studies of the works of Michael Powell and Emeric Pressburger, Martin Scorsese and the development of cinema. He is a regular contributor to Sight & Sound magazine and a frequent broadcaster. Christie is  Professor of Film and Media History at Birkbeck, University of London.

Selected bibliography
 The Art of Film: John Box and Production Design (Wallflower, 2009)   
 A Matter of Life and Death (BFI, 2000)   
 Gilliam on Gilliam (Faber, 1999) [ed.]
 Scorsese on Scorsese (Faber and Faber, 1996 - revised edition) [ed. with David Thompson], 4th edition due in 2010.
 The Last Machine: Early Cinema and the Birth of the Modern World (BBC/BFI, 1994)   
 Arrows of Desire: the films of Michael Powell and Emeric Pressburger (Faber and Faber, 1994 – revised edition)

Audio commentaries
A Canterbury Tale
The Edge of the World, with comments from the director's widow, Thelma Schoonmaker-Powell, and actor Daniel Day-Lewis reading from Michael Powell's memoirs
I Know Where I'm Going!
A Matter of Life and Death
Peeping Tom
The Red Shoes, with actors Marius Goring and Moira Shearer, cinematographer Jack Cardiff, composer Brian Easdale, and filmmaker Martin Scorsese
R.W. Paul: The Collected Films 1895–1908
The Story of the Kelly Gang
That Hamilton Woman

References

External links
 Official website
 
 Birkbeck profile
 MA in Film, Television and Screen Media and Birkbeck College, University of London

Academics of Birkbeck, University of London
Fellows of the British Academy
British film historians
Film theorists
1945 births
Living people
Slade Professors of Fine Art (University of Cambridge)